SEAL Ashram is an Indian NGO that rescues needy and helpless people from the streets and railway stations of Mumbai.  They rescue people and provide them with shelter, food, clothing, health-care and education at SEAL Ashram located at Panvel.  They attempt to trace their families back home. Seal Ashram was established in 1999 by Pastor K M Philip.

They aim to create and support a self sustainable network of team of volunteers to cater to medical, legal, food, clothing, shelter, education and spiritual needs of the underprivileged and destitute. They also provide a platform for the youth to accomplish the mission of SEAL.

Purpose
 To provide a common platform for like-minded people to work together for the welfare of mankind and nation building.
 To strive to feed not only the poor but the hungry.
 To strive to impart talent, knowledge, experiences etc. to  generations.
 To promote and establish an international community of SEALEANs.
 To encourage and motivate the successful to uplift the unsuccessful ones.
 To strive to unite the missing and lost with their loved ones. Death ends life in this world, but missing is an unending agony and trauma for all concerned. 
 To strive to sensitize family and society towards old, sick and downtrodden. 
 The heavily increasing number of destitute on the street is an ongoing disaster. To strive to provide shelter and protection to the destitute.
 To provide relief and rehabilitation help for those who are affected by calamities like, cyclones, earthquakes, epidemics, famine, floods, riots etc.
 To serve as a think tank, discuss and bring forth various issues at various dimensions for improving the quality of life for citizens.

References

External links 
 SEAL Ashram

Organisations based in Mumbai
1999 establishments in Maharashtra
Organizations established in 1999